Amata hellei is a moth of the family Erebidae. It was described by Romieux in 1935. It is found in the Democratic Republic of Congo.

References

 Natural History Museum Lepidoptera generic names catalog

hellei
Moths described in 1935
Moths of Africa
Endemic fauna of the Democratic Republic of the Congo